Dmitry German (born 12 June 1988) is a Belarusian professional footballer who plays for Ostrovets.

Honours
Dinamo Brest
Belarusian Cup winner: 2016–17, 2017–18

References

External links
 
 
 
 Profile at pressball.by

1988 births
Living people
People from Byaroza
Sportspeople from Brest Region
Belarusian footballers
Association football midfielders
Belarusian expatriate footballers
Expatriate footballers in Lithuania
Expatriate footballers in Latvia
Expatriate footballers in Russia
FC Bereza-2010 players
FC Baranovichi players
FC Slonim-2017 players
FC Rechitsa-2014 players
FC Gorodeya players
FC Slavia Mozyr players
FC Dynamo Brest players
FK Atlantas players
FC Slutsk players
FC Rukh Brest players
FC Tambov players
FC Volna Pinsk players
FC Ostrovets players
Belarusian Premier League players
A Lyga players
Russian Premier League players